The 2014–15 National Basketball League (Bulgaria) season was the 74th season of the Bulgarian NBL. The season started on October 11, 2014.

Teams

Regular season

Playoffs

NBL clubs in European competitions

References

External links
NBL official website

National Basketball League (Bulgaria) seasons
Bulgarian
Basketball